Upper Ferry is a local service district and designated place in the Canadian province of Newfoundland and Labrador. It is north of Port aux Basques.

Geography 
Upper Ferry is in Newfoundland within Subdivision A of Division No. 4.

Demographics 

Government 
Upper Ferry is a local service district (LSD) that is governed by a committee responsible for the provision of certain services to the community. The chair of the LSD committee is Robert O'Gorman.

See also 
List of communities in Newfoundland and Labrador
List of designated places in Newfoundland and Labrador
List of local service districts in Newfoundland and Labrador

References 

Populated coastal places in Canada
Designated places in Newfoundland and Labrador
Local service districts in Newfoundland and Labrador